The 2012 BCR Open Romania Ladies was a professional tennis tournament played on outdoor clay courts. It was the 6th edition of the tournament and was part of the 2012 ITF Women's Circuit. It took place in Bucharest, Romania between 16 and 22 July 2012.

WTA entrants

Seeds

 Rankings are as of July 9, 2012.

Other entrants
The following players received wildcards into the singles main draw:
  Elena Bogdan
  Cristina Mitu
  Raluca Olaru
  Patricia Maria Țig

The following players received entry from the qualifying draw:
  Daniëlle Harmsen
  Ana Savić
  Rocío de la Torre-Sánchez
  María-Teresa Torró-Flor

Champions

Singles

 María-Teresa Torró-Flor def.  Garbiñe Muguruza, 6–3, 4–6, 6–4

Doubles

 Irina-Camelia Begu /  Alizé Cornet def.  Elena Bogdan /  Raluca Olaru, 6–2, 6–0

External links
Official website
ITF website

BCR Open Romania Ladies
Clay court tennis tournaments
BCR
BCR
BCR